Sowghanlu or Sughanlu or Sooghanloo may refer to:
 Sowghanlu, Ardabil
 Sowghanlu, West Azerbaijan